Shivalik may refer to:

 Siwalik Hills, a series of ranges of outer foothills of Himalaya crossing Pakistan, India, Nepal, and Bhutan
 Shivalik class frigate, a class of multi-role stealth frigates in service with the Indian Navy
 INS Shivalik (F47), first stealth warship built for India

See also 
 Shivalik Enclave, a town in Haryana, India
 Shivalik Fossil Park, a fossil park in Saketi, India
 Shivalik Nagar, Haridwar, city in Uttarakhand, India